"Calypso" is a song written by John Denver in 1975 as a tribute to Jacques-Yves Cousteau and his research ship, the Calypso. It was featured on Denver's 1975 album Windsong.

Released as the B-side of "I'm Sorry", "Calypso" received substantial airplay, enabling it to chart on the Billboard Hot 100. After "I'm Sorry" fell out of the #1 position, "Calypso" began receiving more airplay than "I'm Sorry," thus causing Billboard to list "Calypso" as the new A-side, starting the week ending October 11, 1975.  Hence, "Calypso" is itself considered a #2 hit on the Hot 100.

John Denver was a close friend of Cousteau. Calypso was the name of Cousteau's research boat that sailed around the world promoting ocean conservation.

This song features the sounds of ship bells, which is heard in the instrumental introductions before both two verses, in which Milton Okun's orchestral arrangement, featuring strings and winds, are heard impersonating the sounds of the oceans and seas.

In popular culture
A filk song exists in Star Trek fandom (and has been quoted in Chapter 8 of Diane Duane's Star Trek novel The Wounded Sky), based on John Denver's "Calypso," but adapted to the voyages of the Enterprise: "To sail on a dream in the sun-fretted darkness, to soar through the starlight unfrightened alone...."

Additionally, Tom Smith wrote parody lyrics for the song, which he titled "Callisto," referring to a sexual desire for Callisto, originally a villainess in the TV show Xena: Warrior Princess and then one of Xena's enemies. After Callisto was redeemed in the Xena stories, he wrote an extra verse and a variation on the refrain that attacked her for having stopped being evil.

In the episode titled "Molly's Out of Town" of Mike & Molly some of the characters sing "Calypso" while they are on the roof of a house.

Charts

Weekly charts

Year-end charts

All-time charts

References

1975 songs
John Denver songs
Songs about explorers
Songs about scientists
Songs about boats
Songs written by John Denver
Song recordings produced by Milt Okun
Cultural depictions of Jacques Cousteau